The 2016 Bolton Metropolitan Borough Council election took place on 5 May 2016 to elect members of Bolton Metropolitan Borough Council in Greater Manchester, England. This was on the same day as other local elections.

20 seats were contested and the Labour Party won 12 seats, the Conservatives won 5 seats, UKIP won 2 seats and the Liberal Democrats won 1 seat.

After the election, the total composition of the council was as follows:
Labour 37
Conservative 15
UK Independence Party 5
Liberal Democrats 3.

Election result

Council Composition
Prior to the election the composition of the council was:

After the election the composition of the council was:

LD - Liberal Democrats
U - UKIP

Ward results

Astley Bridge ward

Bradshaw ward

Breightmet ward

Bromley Cross ward

Crompton ward

Farnworth ward 
Councillor Ibrahim resigned in February 2018 due to time pressures. Paul Sanders of the Farnworth & Kearsley First Party won the by-election a month later.

Great Lever ward

Halliwell ward

Harper Green ward

Heaton and Lostock ward

Horwich and Blackrod ward

Horwich North East ward

Hulton ward

Kearsley ward

Little Lever and Darcy Lever ward

Rumworth ward

Smithills ward

Tonge with the Haulgh ward

Westhoughton North and Chew Moor ward

Westhoughton South ward

References

2016 English local elections
2016
2010s in Greater Manchester